Naukluft Mountain Zebra Park is a protected reserve of Namibia.

The Naukluft section of the Namib-Naukluft Park was initially created as a sanctuary for the Hartmann's mountain zebra.

References

Nature reserves in Namibia